There is a body of films that feature space stations. Science fiction films have featured both real-life space stations such as the International Space Station and Mir as well as fictional ones such as the Death Star and the Satellite of Love.

List of films

Non-documentary films involving direct use of a real space station as a plot

Films involving indirect use of a real space station or use of a fictional space station as a plot

See also
The following films also include spacecraft that have also been called space stations by outside sources:
 Silent Running (1972), which features the space freighter Valley Forge
 The Fifth Element (1997), which features the space liner Fhloston Paradise
 WALL-E (2008), which features the generation ship Axiom

References

Bibliography

External links

Space stations, list of films featuring